Lasiochilus is a genus of true bugs in the subfamily Lasiochilinae and tribe Lasiochilini. There are about 17 described species in Lasiochilus.

Species
These 17 species belong to the genus Lasiochilus:

 Lasiochilus ather Herring
 Lasiochilus comitalis Drake & Harris, 1926
 Lasiochilus decolor (White, 1879)
 Lasiochilus denigratus (White, 1879)
 Lasiochilus divisus Champion, 1900
 Lasiochilus fusculus (Reuter, 1871)
 Lasiochilus gerhardi Blatchley, 1926
 Lasiochilus hirtellus Drake & Harris, 1926
 Lasiochilus microps Champion, 1900
 Lasiochilus mirificus Drake & Harris, 1926
 Lasiochilus montivagus Kirkaldy, 1908
 Lasiochilus nubigenus Kirkaldy, 1908
 Lasiochilus palauensis Herring
 Lasiochilus pallidulus Reuter, 1871
 Lasiochilus silvicola Kirkaldy, 1908
 Lasiochilus socialis Drake & Harris
 Lasiochilus varicolor Uhler, 1894

References

Further reading

 
 

Cimicomorpha genera
Lasiochilidae
Articles created by Qbugbot